Farim (also known as Ferem and Faram) is a city and capital of Dodangeh District, in Sari County, Mazandaran Province, Iran.  At the 2006 census, its population was 180, in 50 families.

References

Populated places in Sari County
Cities in Mazandaran Province